The Free Software Foundation (FSF) is a 501(c)(3) non-profit organization founded by Richard Stallman on October 4, 1985, to support the free software movement, with the organization's preference for software being distributed under copyleft ("share alike") terms, such as with its own GNU General Public License. The FSF was incorporated in Boston, Massachusetts, US, where it is also based.

From its founding until the mid-1990s, FSF's funds were mostly used to employ software developers to write free software for the GNU Project. Since the mid-1990s, the FSF's employees and volunteers have mostly worked on legal and structural issues for the free software movement and the free software community.

Consistent with its goals, the FSF aims to use only free software on its own computers.

History

The Free Software Foundation was founded in 1985 as a non-profit corporation supporting free software development. It continued existing GNU projects such as the sale of manuals and tapes, and employed developers of the free software system. Since then, it has continued these activities, as well as advocating for the free software movement. The FSF is also the steward of several free software licenses, meaning it publishes them and has the ability to make revisions as needed.

The FSF holds the copyrights on many pieces of the GNU system, such as GNU Compiler Collection. As holder of these copyrights, it has the authority to enforce the copyleft requirements of the GNU General Public License (GPL) when copyright infringement occurs on that software.

From 1991 until 2001, GPL enforcement was done informally,  usually by Stallman himself, often with assistance from FSF's lawyer, Eben Moglen. Typically, GPL violations during this time were cleared up by short email exchanges between Stallman and the violator. In the interest of promoting copyleft assertiveness by software companies to the level that the FSF was already doing, in 2004 Harald Welte launched gpl-violations.org.

In late 2001, Bradley M. Kuhn (then executive director), with the assistance of Moglen, David Turner, and Peter T. Brown, formalized these efforts into FSF's GPL Compliance Labs. From 2002–2004, high-profile GPL enforcement cases, such as those against Linksys and OpenTV, became frequent.

GPL enforcement and educational campaigns on GPL compliance was a major focus of the FSF's efforts during this period.

In March 2003, SCO filed suit against IBM alleging that IBM's contributions to various free software, including FSF's GNU, violated SCO's rights. While FSF was never a party to the lawsuit, FSF was subpoenaed on November 5, 2003. During 2003 and 2004, FSF put substantial advocacy effort into responding to the lawsuit and quelling its negative impact on the adoption and promotion of free software.

From 2003 to 2005, FSF held legal seminars to explain the GPL and the surrounding law. Usually taught by Bradley M. Kuhn and Daniel Ravicher, these seminars offered CLE credit and were the first effort to give formal legal education on the GPL.

In 2007, the FSF published the third version of the GNU General Public License after significant outside input.

In December 2008, FSF filed a lawsuit against Cisco for using GPL-licensed components shipped with Linksys products. Cisco was notified of the licensing issue in 2003 but Cisco repeatedly disregarded its obligations under the GPL. In May 2009, FSF dropped the lawsuit when Cisco agreed to make a monetary donation to the FSF and appoint a Free Software Director to conduct continuous reviews of the company's license compliance practices.

In September 2019, Richard Stallman resigned as president of the FSF after pressure from journalists and members of the open source community in response to him making controversial comments in defense of then-deceased Marvin Minsky on Jeffrey Epstein's sex trafficking scandal. Nevertheless, Stallman remained head of the GNU Project and in 2021, he returned to the FSF board of directors.

Current and ongoing activities

The GNU Project 

The original purpose of the FSF was to promote the ideals of free software. The organization developed the GNU operating system as an example of this.

GNU licenses 
The GNU General Public License (GPL) is a widely used license for free software projects. The current version (version 3) was released in June 2007. The FSF has also published the GNU Lesser General Public License (LGPL), the GNU Free Documentation License (GFDL), and the GNU Affero General Public License (AGPL).

GNU Press 
The FSF's publishing department, responsible for "publishing affordable books on computer science using freely distributable licenses."

The Free Software Directory 

This is a listing of software packages that have been verified as free software. Each package entry contains up to 47 pieces of information such as the project's homepage, developers, programming language, etc. The goals are to provide a search engine for free software, and to provide a cross-reference for users to check if a package has been verified as being free software. FSF has received a small amount of funding from UNESCO for this project.

Maintaining the Free Software Definition 

FSF maintains many of the documents that define the free software movement.

Project hosting 
FSF hosts software development projects on its Savannah website.

h-node 
An abbreviation for "Hardware-Node", the h-node website lists hardware and device drivers that have been verified as compatible with free software. It is user-edited and volunteer supported with hardware entries tested by users before publication.

Advocacy 
FSF sponsors a number of campaigns against what it perceives as dangers to software freedom, including software patents, digital rights management (which the FSF and others have re-termed "digital restrictions management", as part of its effort to highlight technologies that are "designed to take away and limit your rights,") and user interface copyright. Defective by Design is an FSF-initiated campaign against DRM. It also has a campaign to promote Ogg+Vorbis, a free alternative to proprietary formats like AAC and MQA. FSF also sponsors free software projects it deems "high-priority".

Annual awards 

"Award for the Advancement of Free Software" and "Free Software Award for Projects of Social Benefit"

LibrePlanet wiki 
The LibrePlanet wiki organizes FSF members into regional groups in order to promote free software activism against Digital Restrictions Management and other issues promoted by the FSF.

High priority projects

The FSF maintains a list of "high priority projects" to which the Foundation claims that "there is a vital need to draw the free software community's attention". The FSF considers these projects "important because computer users are continually being seduced into using non-free software, because there is no adequate free replacement."

As of 2021, high priority tasks include reverse engineering proprietary firmware; reversible debugging in GNU Debugger; developing automatic transcription and video editing software, Coreboot, drivers for network routers, a free smartphone operating system and creating replacements for Skype and Siri.

Previous projects highlighted as needing work included the Free Java implementations, GNU Classpath, and GNU Compiler for Java, which ensure compatibility for the Java part of OpenOffice.org, and the GNOME desktop environment (see Java: Licensing).

The effort has been criticized by Michael Larabel for either not instigating active development or for being slow at the work being done, even after certain projects were added to the list.

Endorsements

Operating systems
The FSF maintains a list of approved Linux operating systems that maintain free software by default:
Dragora GNU/Linux-Libre
dyne:bolic
GNU Guix System
Hyperbola GNU/Linux-libre
Parabola GNU/Linux-libre
PureOS
Trisquel
Ututo
LibreCMC
ProteanOS
The project also maintains a list of operating systems that are not versions of the GNU system:
Replicant

Discontinued operating systems
The following are previously endorsed operating systems that are no longer actively maintained:
gNewSense
BLAG Linux and GNU
Musix GNU+Linux

Hardware endorsements (RYF)

The FSF maintains a "Respects Your Freedom" (RYF) hardware certification program. To be granted certification, a product must use 100% Free Software, allow user installation of modified software, be free of backdoors and conform with several other requirements.

Structure

Board

The FSF's board of directors includes professors at leading universities, senior engineers, and founders.  Current board members are:

 Geoffrey Knauth, senior software engineer at SFA, Inc. (served since October 23, 1997)
 Henry Poole, founder of CivicActions, a government digital services firm (served since December 12, 2002)
 Gerald Jay Sussman, professor of computer science at the Massachusetts Institute of Technology (served since inception)
 Ian Kelling, Senior Systems Administrator at the FSF and the staff representative on the board.
 Odile Bénassy, research engineer at the Paris-sud university computer science research 
 Richard Stallman, founder, launched the GNU project, author of the GNU General Public License.

Previous board members include:

 Alexander Oliva, Vice President (served since August 28, 2019)
 Hal Abelson, founding member, professor of computer science at the Massachusetts Institute of Technology (served from inception until March 5, 1998, and rejoined circa 2005)
 Robert J. Chassell, founding treasurer, as well as a founding director (served from inception until June 3, 1997)
 Miguel de Icaza (served from August 1999 until February 25, 2002)
 Benjamin Mako Hill, assistant professor at the University of Washington (served from July 25, 2007 until October 2019)
 Matthew Garrett, software developer (served since October 16, 2014)
 Bradley Kuhn, executive director of the Software Freedom Conservancy and FSF's former executive director (served from March 25, 2010 to Oct 13, 2019)
 Lawrence Lessig, professor of law at Stanford University (served from March 28, 2004 until 2008)
 Eben Moglen (served from July 28, 2000 until 2007)
 Len Tower Jr., founding member, (served until September 2, 1997)
 Kat Walsh, copyright and technology attorney, free culture and free software advocate, and former chair of the Wikimedia Foundation. She joined the board in 2015. She voted against the readmittance of Richard Stallman to the board and, on March 25, 2021, resigned saying "It's a decision that has been a long time coming for me".

Executive directors
Executive directors include:
 John Sullivan (2011-2022)
 Peter T. Brown (2005–2010)
 Bradley M. Kuhn (2001–2005)

Voting
The FSF Articles of Organization state that the board of directors are elected.

The bylaws say who can vote for them.

The board can grant powers to the Voting Membership.

Employment
At any given time, there are usually around a dozen employees. Most, but not all, work at the FSF headquarters in Boston, Massachusetts.

Membership
On November 25, 2002, the FSF launched the FSF Associate Membership program for individuals. Bradley M. Kuhn (FSF executive director, 2001–2005) launched the program and also signed up as the first Associate Member

Associate members are primarily an honorary and funding support role. In 2023, associate members gained the ability to make board nominations, along with FSF staff and FSF voting members. There is also an annual meeting of FSF members, usually during lunch at LibrePlanet, in which feedback for FSF is solicited.

Legal
Eben Moglen and Dan Ravicher previously served individually as pro bono legal counsel to the FSF. After forming the Software Freedom Law Center, Eben Moglen continued to serve as the FSF's general counsel until 2016.

Financial
Most of the FSF funding comes from patrons and members. Revenue streams also come from free-software-related compliance labs, job postings, published works, and a web store. FSF offers speakers and seminars for pay, and all FSF projects accept donations.

Revenues fund free-software programs and campaigns, while cash is invested conservatively in socially responsible investing. The financial strategy is designed to maintain the Foundation's long-term future through economic stability.

The FSF is a tax-exempt organization and posts annual IRS Form 990 filings online.

Criticism

Position on DRM
Linus Torvalds has criticized FSF for using GPLv3 as a weapon in the fight against DRM. Torvalds argues that the issue of DRM and that of a software license should be treated as two separate issues.

Defective by Design campaign
On June 16, 2010, Joe Brockmeier, a journalist at Linux Magazine, criticized the Defective by Design campaign by the FSF as "negative" and "juvenile" and not being adequate for providing users with "credible alternatives" to proprietary software. FSF responded to this criticism by saying "that there is a fundamental difference between speaking out against policies or actions and smear campaigns", and "that if one is taking an ethical position, it is justified, and often necessary, to not only speak about the benefits of freedom but against acts of dispossession and disenfranchisement."

GNU LibreDWG license controversy
In 2009, a license update of LibDWG/LibreDWG to the version 3 of the GNU GPL, made it impossible for the free software projects LibreCAD and FreeCAD to use LibreDWG legally. Many projects voiced their unhappiness about the GPLv3 license selection for LibreDWG, such as FreeCAD, LibreCAD, Assimp, and Blender. Some suggested the selection of a license with a broader license compatibility, for instance the MIT, BSD, or LGPL 2.1. A request went to the FSF to relicense GNU LibreDWG as GPLv2, which was rejected in 2012.

The libDWG has stalled since 2011 for various reasons, including license issues.

Accusations against Richard Stallman 
In 2019 Richard Stallman replied to an internal MIT mailing list post to criticize a statement claiming that Marvin Minsky harmed one of Jeffrey Epstein's victims. The poster of the email responded by publishing the email on a blog along with some stories which vaguely painted RMS as a misogynist. The accusations were later publicly rebuked by multiple people. As a result of widespread negative media coverage, Stallman resigned as the FSF president and an FSF board member. However, he remained an FSF voting member, an FSF volunteer, and the head of the GNU Project, which FSF dedicates a significant portion of its resources to supporting. There was no public indication as to whether he continued to participate in FSF board meetings as a guest. 

Stallman rejoined the board 18 months later but remained stepped down from the presidency. News stories implied that he had left the FSF in general and had now returned. He joined as one of 7 board members. The FSF by-laws define the president as a chief executive officer. Stallman announced he had rejoined the board during a talk at LibrePlanet in blithe manner. Several prominent organizations and individuals who develop free software objected to the decision of him rejoining the board, citing past writings on Stallman's blog which they considered antithetical to promoting a diverse community. As a result of Stallman's reinstatement Red Hat announced that it would stop donating to the Free Software Foundation. However, the FSF quickly announced that less than 3% of its funding came from direct corporate support and that it was in good financial health.

The FSF staff were not expecting Stallman's announcement and after it drew negative attention, some resigned. The board enacted a series of reforms in the aftermath. They included a code of ethics, a union elected staff seat on the board, a transparent community informed process of electing new board members to be followed by a community informed review of existing board members. FSF hired 3 new staff by summer 2022. By that time, it had one staff position unfilled and one filled part time out of 13 full time staff positions.

Recognition

Key players and industries that have made honorific mention and awards include:

 2001: GNU Project received the USENIX Lifetime Achievement Award for "the ubiquity, breadth, and quality of its freely available redistributable and modifiable software, which has enabled a generation of research and commercial development".
 2005: Prix Ars Electronica Award of Distinction in the category of "Digital Communities"

See also

 
 
 
 
 
 
 
 Foundations promoting Free Software movement:
 Free Software Foundation Europe
 Free Software Foundation Latin America
 Free Software Foundation of India

Notes

References

External links

 
 LibrePlanet

 
1985 establishments in Massachusetts
501(c)(3) organizations
Charities based in Massachusetts
Digital rights organizations
Educational charities based in the United States
Free and open-source software organizations
Free software movement
Intellectual property activism
Non-profit organizations based in Boston
Non-profit technology
Organizations based in Boston
Organizations established in 1985
Science and technology think tanks